Technological University, Magway (also known as TU (Magway)) is a university located near the Kanbyar village, Magway in the Magway Region of Myanmar. The area of the university is 28.82 acre.

History
TU (Magway) was formerly known as Government Technological College, GTC (Magway). GTC (Magway) was founded on 27 December 1999. Ever since its founding, GTC (Magway) has been aiming at becoming an international level university of higher learning providing a broad range of academic programs. It offered two-year diplomas on vocational studies and three-year Bachelor of Technology (B-Tech) programs. On 20 January 2007, it was promoted as Technological University which offered undergraduate degree programs in Civil Engineering, Electrical Communication Engineering, Electrical Power Engineering, Mechanical Engineering, Mechatronic Engineering and Chemical Engineering.

Programs

List of Principal

Faculty
TU (Magway) has six engineering departments, three academic departments and three supporting administration units.

Engineering Departments
Civil Engineering Department
Electronic Engineering Department
Electrical Power Engineering Department
Mechanical Engineering Department
Mechatronic Engineering Department
Chemical Engineering Department

Academic departments
Engineering Mathematics Department
Engineering Science Department
Language Department

Administrative Units
Administration Department
Student's Affairs Department
Finance Department
Library Department

List of Principles 
Daw San San Yee (1.12.1999 to 15.10.2002)
Daw Myint Myint Oo (16.10.2002 to 15.3.2004)
Dr. Yin Mon Myint (16.3.2004 to 16.9.2004)
Dr. Khaing Khaing Aye (17.9.2004 to 18.10.2006)
Dr. Thet Naing (19.10.2006 to 31.12.2006)
Dr. Nanda Tun Oo (1.1.2007 to 4.9.2007)
Dr. Thant Zin Win (5.9.2007 to 29.6.2008)
Dr. Nanda Kyaw	(30.6.2008 to 9.12.2010)
Dr. Yan Naing Tun (10.12.2010 to 10.3.2011)
Dr. Htein Win (11.3.2011 to 27.4.2015)
Dr. Htain Lin Aye (28.4.2015 to 31.8.2015)
Dr. Mya Nandar Lwin (1.9.2015 to present)

External links

Universities and colleges in Magway Region
Technological universities in Myanmar